Rodrigo Gomes dos Santos (born 13 October 1993), commonly known as Rodrigão, is a Brazilian footballer who plays as a striker for Vitória.

Club career

Early career
Born in Belmonte, Bahia, Rodrigão joined Democrata-GV in late 2013, after impressing on a trial basis. He made his debut for the club in the following year, in Campeonato Mineiro Módulo II. In March 2015 he moved to Boa Esporte.

Rodrigão made his professional debut on 8 May 2015, starting in a 0–1 away loss against Atlético Goianiense for the Série B championship. On 9 June, after appearing in only five games, he was released.

Campinense
On 19 June 2015 Rodrigão joined Campinense in Série D. On 12 July he scored a brace in a 2–0 home win against Globo, and added a hat-trick in a 3–1 win against Coruripe on 16 August.

Rodrigão started the 2016 season with a match-winning goal in a 2–1 Campeonato Paraibano home success over CSP on 30 January. He also scored two further hat-tricks in the following month, against Esporte de Patos (7–1 home win) and Imperatriz (3–0 away win).

Santos
On 19 March 2016 Rodrigão agreed to a pre-contract with Série A club Santos, with the deal being effective on 1 June. He signed a five-year contract with the club on 30 May, being immediately included in the first team squad.

Rodrigão made his Peixe – and Série A – debut on 22 June 2016, starting and scoring his team's first in a 4–2 away win against Fluminense; he also provided the assist for Luiz Felipe's fourth goal. He added his second goal four days later, the second in a 3–0 home success over São Paulo.

Rodrigão acted mainly as a backup to Ricardo Oliveira during the rest of the year, and scored only league three goals. He started the 2017 campaign by scoring a double in a 6–2 Campeonato Paulista home routing of Linense, as Oliveira was still recuperating from mumps.

On 7 July 2017, after struggling with injuries and being demoted to third-choice after the arrival of Kayke, Rodrigão was loaned to fellow top tier club Bahia until the end of the season.

Back to Santos, Rodrigão began the 2018 season as a starter under new manager Jair Ventura. On 9 April of that year, after losing competition to new signings Eduardo Sasha and Gabriel, he was loaned to Série B side Avaí until December.

On 6 February 2019, Rodrigão was presented at Coritiba still in the second division, after agreeing to a one-year loan deal. On 30 December, after helping with 13 league goals as his side achieved promotion, he joined Ceará in the top tier, on loan for one year.

In November 2020, after falling down the pecking order, Rodrigão left Ceará and returned to his former side Avaí, also in a temporary deal. He also featured rarely at his new side, and moved to Ponte Preta on loan on 8 June 2021.

Sport Recife
In February 2022, Rodrigão terminated his contract with Santos and joined Sport Recife on a short-term deal.

Career statistics

References

External links
Santos FC profile 

1993 births
Living people
Sportspeople from Bahia
Brazilian footballers
Association football forwards
Campeonato Brasileiro Série A players
Campeonato Brasileiro Série B players
Campeonato Brasileiro Série C players
Campeonato Brasileiro Série D players
Esporte Clube Democrata players
Boa Esporte Clube players
Campinense Clube players
Santos FC players
Esporte Clube Bahia players
Avaí FC players
Coritiba Foot Ball Club players
Ceará Sporting Club players
Associação Atlética Ponte Preta players
Sport Club do Recife players
Esporte Clube Vitória players